Oscar or Oskar of Sweden may refer to:

Oscar I of Sweden (1799–1859), King of Sweden 1844 to 1859
Oscar II of Sweden (1829–1907), King of Sweden 1872 to 1907
Oscar, Prince Bernadotte, Prince of Sweden 1852
Prince Oscar, Duke of Skåne, Prince of Sweden 2016